Verity Eileen Bargate (1940–1981) was an English novelist and theatre director. In 1969, she co-founded the cutting-edge Soho Theatre Company, later known as the Soho Theatre. She also wrote three novels, No mama No, Children Crossing, and Tit for Tat.
Her first husband was Soho Theatre co-founder Fred Proud. Her second husband, till her death, was the playwright and screenwriter Barrie Keeffe. She died of cancer at the age of 41.
After her death, the Verity Bargate Award was set up in her memory to encourage and reward new writing in the theatre.

Biography 
By Irving Wardle taken from the DNB, 
Verity Eileen Bargate [married names Proud, Keeffe], Verity Eileen (1940–1981), theatre producer and novelist, was born on 6 August 1940 in Exeter, the second child of Ronald Arthur Bargate, electrical shopkeeper and later sales manager in the London Metal Warehouse, and his wife, Eileen Dewes. Her childhood was disrupted by her parents' divorce in 1944, followed by her mother's departure to Australia, leaving Bargate and her elder brother Simon for four years in the care of their father. When her mother returned it was with a new husband, Clarke Taylor, a Royal Air Force doctor, who installed his new family in air force bases at Hornchurch, Essex, and Bicester, Oxfordshire, and dispatched his stepdaughter to a succession of boarding-schools and holiday homes. In later years she described her upbringing as that of a ‘middle-class charity child’ (private information).On leaving school Bargate trained as a nurse at the Westminster Hospital, London, where she qualified as a state registered nurse and supplemented her income with private nursing. Although she was emotionally and physically unsuited to this profession (in which she came to rely on the ‘pep pills’ that sowed the seeds of her future intermittent spells of ill health), it was five years before she abandoned nursing and took a job with a media analysis firm in Paddington, London, where she remained until her meeting and subsequent marriage on 14 February 1970 to Fred Proud, with whom she had two sons, Sam Valentine (b. 1971) and Thomas Orlando (b. 1973).Proud was an aspirant director who had studied at the Rose Bruford College, and with Bargate he launched the Soho Theatre at an address in New Compton Street in 1969, as a somewhat late arrival on London's lunchtime theatre scene. With a policy of offering new and little-known work at low prices, it established itself as a home of good acting and arresting texts—which ranged from modern English and American plays to Sheridan and Cervantes. Reviewers got to know Bargate as the beautiful long-legged girl on the door. She had no theatrical experience but she knew about public relations work, and one reason for the theatre's success was her ability to win over the press with intelligence, good humour, and excellent home-cooked food. Even so, its position was precarious; and in 1971 it was obliged to quit its original premises for a temporary home at the King's Head Theatre in Upper Street, Islington (to which it introduced lunchtime shows), before finding a more secure base in Riding House Street (behind Broadcasting House) in the following year, and changing its name to the Soho Poly. Shortly after this move the marriage collapsed, leaving Bargate (from 1975) as the theatre's sole artistic director. She seldom directed shows herself; instead she emerged as a persistent and effective encourager of new talent. Policy for her meant ‘putting on what I liked’ (private information). This involved extending the lunchtime programme to full-length evening productions; opening the doors to women directors and designers; and concentrating exclusively on living writers with whom she worked as a catalyst and a midwife. Not all of them were full-time playwrights. The actor Bob Hoskins claims that she saved him from insanity by letting him present his one-man piece, The Bystander, as a therapeutic exercise. Among those whose careers advanced from the Poly to other stages were Hanif Kureishi, Tony Marchant, Michelene Wandor, Caryl Churchill and Barrie Colin Keeffe (b. 1945), whose studies of alienated working-class youth spoke for a hitherto voiceless generation. In Keeffe Bargate found a second partner who also persuaded her to embark on writing of her own; from this point her life underwent a powerful and subsequently fatal acceleration. Until now she had played the public role of a hopeful supporter of others, which had masked her spells of ill health and her private sense of oncoming calamity. She was convinced that, like her mother, she would die at the age of forty, and it was of great significance to her that her birthday fell on the same date as that of the bombing of Hiroshima. The dark side of her nature now found expression in her writing. With grim logic, her birth as a novelist coincided with the onset of cancer, and the remainder of her life became a neck-and-neck race between creativity and disease. Of Bargate's three books, No Mama No was published in 1978, and Children Crossing in 1979. At the insistence of her publisher Tit for Tat (1981) was rewritten in its entirety, even though Bargate had one arm in a sling at the time. Her subjects were the lies and cruelties of the sexual contract, and the emotional wounds parents and children inflict on each other. Terrible things happen. A seaside holiday ends with the children dead under a juggernaut: mastectomy becomes an instrument of sexual revenge. But the narrative voice is irresistible, and connects the immediate events to a deep well of early pain. Verity Bargate died in Greenwich Hospital, London, on 18 May 1981, two months after her marriage on 14 February to Keeffe and a month after the publication of her final book. Her ashes were scattered on the lake of Lewisham Crematorium. Her memorials are her books, her theatre, and the annual Verity Bargate award for short plays.

References

1940 births
1981 deaths
Writers from Exeter
English theatre directors
20th-century English novelists